"Sakura" is the 45th single by Japanese boy band Arashi. It was released on February 25, 2015 under their record label J Storm. "Sakura" was used as the theme song for the television drama Ouroborous, starring actors Toma Ikuta and Shun Oguri. The single was released in two editions: a first press/limited edition and a regular edition. The first press/limited edition contains the B-side "Rise and Shine" and the music video and making-of for "Sakura" while the regular edition contains two B-sides. The single sold 465,381 copies in its first week and topped the weekly Oricon Singles Chart. With over 520,000 copies sold, the single was certified Double Platinum by the Recording Industry Association of Japan (RIAJ). The single placed 11th on Oricon's 2015 yearly singles ranking.

Single information
The first press/limited edition contains the music video and making-of for "Sakura", the B-side "Rise and Shine" and its instrumental, and a 16-page lyrics booklet while the regular edition contains the B-sides "Onaji Sora no Shita de" and "more and more", and the instrumentals for all three tracks. The album jacket covers for both versions are different.

"Sakura" was used as the theme song for the television drama Ouroborous, starring actors Toma Ikuta and Shun Oguri. This marks the first time Arashi has provided a theme song for a drama that did not star one of its members.

Track listing

Chart performance
The single debuted at number one on the Oricon daily singles chart selling 239,867 copies upon its release and selling 465,381 copies by the end of the week, topping the Oricon and Billboard Japan weekly singles charts. The single sold 30,490 copies in its second week and stayed in the top ten for three consecutive weeks. With 521,067 copies sold, the single placed 11th on Oricon's 2015 yearly singles ranking and third on Billboard Japan's top singles year-end list.

Charts and certifications

Charts

Sales and certifications

Release history

References

External links
Sakura product information
February 2015 Hard Copy Sales Certifications 2015 Recording Industry Association of Japan (RIAJ)

2015 songs
Songs about cherry blossom